Angles of Repose is an album by American composer, saxophonist and clarinet player Joe Maneri with bassist Barre Phillips and violinist Mat Maneri recorded in 2002 and released on the ECM label.

Reception
The Allmusic review by Thom Jurek awarded the album 4 stars stating "this music sings. It's true the singing is balladic and dirgelike much of the time, but it is pastoral, too, and gentle and sweetly elegiac. It bears repeated listening and meets the listener readily, offering a standard-bearing effectiveness in how the poetry of collective improvisation should be realized and articulated".

Track listing
All compositions by Joe Maneri, Mat Maneri and Barre Phillips except as indicated
 "Angles of Repose No. 1" – 4:44 
 "Angles of Repose No. 2" – 7:39 
 "Angles of Repose No. 3" (Joe Maneri) – 3:28 
 "Angles of Repose No. 4" – 10:10 
 "Angles of Repose No. 5" (Mat Maneri, Barre Phillips) – 6:41 
 "Angles of Repose No. 6" – 9:33 
 "Angles of Repose No. 7" – 1:08 
 "Angles of Repose No. 8" – 2:32 
 "Angles of Repose No. 9" – 15:38 
 "Angles of Repose No. 10" – 9:39 
Recorded at the Chapelle Sainte Philomène in Puget-Ville, France in May 2002

Personnel
Joe Maneri – clarinet, alto saxophone, tenor saxophone
Barre Phillips – double bass
Mat Maneri – viola

References

 

2004 albums
ECM Records albums
Joe Maneri albums